The Texas Rangers 1983 season involved the Rangers finishing third in the American League West with a record of 77 wins and 85 losses. The Rangers did break a Major League Baseball record for the most runs ever scored by one team during a single extra inning.

Regular season

Season standings

Record vs. opponents

Opening Day starters 
 Buddy Bell
 Bucky Dent
 Dave Hostetler
 Pete O'Brien
 Larry Parrish
 Mike Richardt
 Billy Sample
 Mike Smithson
 Jim Sundberg
 George Wright

Notable transactions 
 August 19, 1983: Rick Honeycutt was traded by the Rangers to the Los Angeles Dodgers for Dave Stewart, a player to be named later and $200,000. The Dodgers completed by sending Ricky Wright to the Rangers on September 16.

Roster

Player stats

Batting

Starters by position 
Note: Pos = Position; G = Games played; AB = At bats; H = Hits; Avg. = Batting average; HR = Home runs; RBI = Runs batted in

Other batters 
Note: G = Games played; AB = At bats; H = Hits; Avg. = Batting average; HR = Home runs; RBI = Runs batted in

Pitching

Starting pitchers 
Note: G = Games pitched; IP = Innings pitched; W = Wins; L = Losses; ERA = Earned run average; SO = Strikeouts

Other pitchers 
Note: G = Games pitched; IP = Innings pitched; W = Wins; L = Losses; ERA = Earned run average; SO = Strikeouts

Relief pitchers 
Note: G = Games pitched; W = Wins; L = Losses; SV = Saves; ERA = Earned run average; SO = Strikeouts

Awards and honors 
Buddy Bell, 3B, Gold Glove 1983
All-Star Game

Team leaders 
 Larry Parrish, Home Runs, 26
 Larry Parrish, RBI, 88
 Billy Sample, Runs, 80
 Billy Sample, Stolen bases, 44
 Buddy Bell, Batting average, .277
 George Wright, Hits, 175

Farm system

Notable events
July 3 — The Rangers score twelve runs in the fifteenth inning to defeat the Oakland Athletics 16–4, in the process breaking the MLB record for most runs scored during one single extra inning, previously held by the 1928 New York Yankees.

Notes

References 
1983 Texas Rangers at Baseball Reference
1983 Texas Rangers at Baseball Almanac

Texas Rangers seasons
Texas Rangers season
1983 in sports in Texas